Veresna is a village in Ukraine located in Zviahel Raion, Zhytomyr Oblast. The code KOATUUI: 1820684202. Its population is 172 people as 2001. Its postal index is 12710. Its calling code is 4144.

Address of the village council 
12734, Ukraine, Zhytomyr Oblast, Zviahel Raion, village Mokroe.

External links 
  Veresna on website High Rada of Ukraine 

Populated places in Zhytomyr Oblast